Pavel Sergeyevich Trakhanov (21 March 1978 – 7 September 2011) was a Russian professional ice hockey defenceman who played for Lokomotiv Yaroslavl of the Kontinental Hockey League (KHL).

Death
On 7 September 2011, Trakhanov was killed in the 2011 Lokomotiv Yaroslavl plane crash, when a Yakovlev Yak-42 passenger aircraft, carrying nearly the entire Lokomotiv team, crashed just outside Yaroslavl, Russia. The team was traveling to Minsk, Belarus to play their opening game of the season, with its coaching staff and prospects. Lokomotiv officials said "'everyone from the main roster was on the plane plus four players from the youth team.'"

See also
List of ice hockey players who died during their playing career

References

External links

1978 births
2011 deaths
Atlant Moscow Oblast players
Lokomotiv Yaroslavl players
Russian ice hockey defencemen
Ice hockey people from Moscow
Victims of the Lokomotiv Yaroslavl plane crash